The Implementation Monitoring and Evaluation Division is a Bangladesh government division under the Ministry of Planning. It is responsible for monitoring and evaluation of development projects under the annual development program. It is also responsible for inspecting field projects and submitting reports to the President of Bangladesh and relevant ministers. It also oversees the activities of Central Procurement Technical Unit. Abul Mansur Md. Faizullah is the Secretary in charge of the division.

History
Implementation Monitoring and Evaluation Division was established in 1996 through the Rules of Business act. In 1997, the division received financial support from the Asian Development Bank to upgrade its capabilities.

References

1996 establishments in Bangladesh
Organisations based in Dhaka
Government agencies of Bangladesh
Government departments of Bangladesh